Natalie Quillian is an American political strategist serving as a White House deputy chief of staff during the Biden administration since February 2023. She previously served as the White House deputy Coronavirus response coordinator from January 2021 to April 2022. Quillian was a senior advisor to Denis McDonough, the White House chief of staff, during the Obama administration.

Life 
Quillian completed an bachelor's degree in mathematics from Middlebury College. She earned a master's degree from the Princeton School of Public and International Affairs. 

Quillian was a Presidential Management Fellow in the Office of the Secretary of Defense where she worked as a political officer for the Embassy of the United States, Kabul. From 2010 to 2011, she was a Next Generation National Security Fellow where she served as a special assistant to the principal deputy Under Secretary of Defense for Policy. During the Obama administration, Quillian worked at The Pentagon and the United States National Security Council. She later served as a senior advisor to White House chief of staff Denis McDonough.

Quillian was a deputy campaign manager during the Joe Biden 2020 presidential campaign. She later served as the deputy Covid-19 Response Coordinator for 15 months under Jeff Zients. She left the Biden administration in April 2022. She rejoined the administration in the fall of 2022. In February 2023, Quillian was appointed as a White House Deputy Chief of Staff.

References

Living people
White House Deputy Chiefs of Staff
Year of birth missing (living people)
Place of birth missing (living people)
Biden administration personnel
Obama administration personnel
United States National Security Council staffers
Middlebury College alumni
Princeton School of Public and International Affairs alumni